The Muslim Executive of Belgium is the official Muslim interlocutor of the Belgian federal government for the implementation of the July 19, 1974 law recognizing Islam as one of the subsidized religious or secular communities in Belgium according to the law of March 4, 1870.

It was set up by a royal decree on July 3, 1996. The group is close to Moroccan officialdom.

In 2018, the Great Mosque of Brussels came under the control of the Muslim Executive of Belgium after the Belgian government terminated the concession of Saudi Arabia.

Presidents
Dr. Didier-Yacine Beyens (Belgian convert; physician) 1996-1999.
Nordin Maloujahmoun (male French-speaking dual Belgian-Moroccan citizen; fiscal inspector) 1999-2003.
Mohamed Boulif (male French-speaking dual Belgian-Moroccan citizen; economist in a Luxemburg bank) 2003-2005 (ousted by the Justice Minister Laurette Onkelinx, who provoked new elections before the Assembly's term).
Coskun Beyazgül (male French-speaking dual Belgian-Turkish citizen; Diyanet's official), with as vice-presidents Kissi Benjelloul (male French-speaking Moroccan with a French passport; butcher) and Hacer Düzgün (female Dutch-speaking Belgian with dual Belgian-Turkish citizenship; religion teacher) 2005-2008.
Shemsettin Ugurlu (male French-speaking dual Belgian-Turkish citizen; religion teacher), with as vice-president Isabelle (Soumaya) Praile (Belgian convert; religion teacher; Shi'a Muslim) and Mehmet Üstün (male Dutch-speaking Belgian with dual Belgian-Turkish citizenship).

See also 

 Central Council of Muslims in Germany
 Council on American-Islamic Relations
 French Council of the Muslim Faith
 Great Mosque of Brussels
 Islam in Belgium
 Islamic Commission of Spain
 Muslim Council of Britain
 Muslim Council of Sweden

Sources

Islam in Belgium
Organisations based in Belgium